Pound of Flesh is a 2015 Canadian action thriller film directed by Ernie Barbarash, and starring Jean-Claude Van Damme, Charlotte Peters, and Darren Shahlavi. It is the third collaboration between Van Damme and Barbarash (following Assassination Games in 2011 and Six Bullets in 2012).

Plot
Deacon, a former black-ops agent, is in Manila, Philippines awaiting an operation to donate his kidney to his dying niece. He awakens the day before the procedure to find he is a victim of organ theft. Stitched up and furious, Deacon descends from his opulent hotel in search of his stolen kidney and carves a blood-soaked path through the darkest corners of the city - brothels, fight clubs, back-alley black markets, and elite billionaire estates. The clock is ticking for his niece and with each step he loses blood; Deacon, his brother, and his former underworld connections will journey through society's seedy underbelly, proving to anyone who crosses their path, nothing means more to a man than his flesh and blood.

Cast

Production

Filming
Principal photography and production ended on May 24, 2014.

On January 14, 2015, Shahlavi died in his sleep at the age of 42. The film's end credits start with an In memoriam to him.

Reception

Critical response
On review aggregator website Rotten Tomatoes, the film holds an approval rating of 17%, based on 12 reviews, and an average rating of 3.7/10. On Metacritic, the film has a weighted average score of 41 out of 100, based on 5 critics, indicating "mixed or average reviews".

References

External links
 
 Pound of Flesh (2015)

2015 films
English-language Canadian films
Canadian action thriller films
2015 action thriller films
Films about organ trafficking
Films about organ transplantation
Films set in the Philippines
Films directed by Ernie Barbarash
2010s English-language films
2010s Canadian films